José María Ortigoza Ortiz (born 1 April 1987) is a Paraguayan football striker who plays for Cerro Porteño.

Career

Club
Ortigoza started his career with the Paraguayan club Sol de América, where he played alongside Pablo Zeballos. He quickly made a good impression and established himself as one of the team's best players, finishing second in goal-scoring in the Apertura 2008 tournament along with Julio Aguilar. In 2009, Ortigoza was transferred to Palmeiras.

In January 2010, Ortigoza was loaned out to the K-League side Ulsan Hyundai FC from Sol de América.

In January 2011, he signed for Brazilian club Cruzeiro EC on loan.

Ortigoza transferred to Chinese Super League side Shandong Luneng in July 2012. However, after scoring 2 goals in 10 appearances, he was released by Shandong in February 2013.

Ortigoza signed a contract with J1 League club Ventforet Kofu on 22 March 2013. However, after scoring only 1 goal in 8 appearances, he was released by Kofu in June 2013.

International
On 11 November 2010, he earned his first international goals in a match against Hong Kong, scoring two goals.

International goals

Honours

Club

 Sol de América

División Intermedia: 1
Winner: 2006

References

External links

 

 
 José Ortigoza at BDFA.com.ar 
 

Paraguayan footballers
Club Sol de América footballers
Sociedade Esportiva Palmeiras players
Cruzeiro Esporte Clube players
Paraguayan expatriate footballers
Expatriate footballers in Brazil
Ulsan Hyundai FC players
Shandong Taishan F.C. players
Ventforet Kofu players
Cerro Porteño players
Atlas F.C. footballers
Paraná Clube players
Club Guaraní players
Clube Náutico Capibaribe players
Paraguayan Primera División players
Campeonato Brasileiro Série A players
Campeonato Brasileiro Série C players
K League 1 players
J1 League players
Chinese Super League players
Liga MX players
1987 births
Living people
Association football forwards
Paraguayan expatriate sportspeople in South Korea
Paraguayan expatriate sportspeople in China
Paraguayan expatriate sportspeople in Japan
Paraguayan expatriate sportspeople in Mexico
Expatriate footballers in South Korea
Expatriate footballers in China
Expatriate footballers in Japan
Expatriate footballers in Mexico
Paraguay international footballers